Sir Adolphe Abrahams  (6 February 1883 – 11 December 1967) was a British medical doctor, and he is considered to be the founder of British sports science.

Career
Abrahams was born in Cape Town on 6 February 1883, as the son of Isaac and Esther Abrahams. He was educated at Bedford Modern School between 1891 and 1899, at Bedford School, and at Emmanuel College, Cambridge.

Abrahams is considered the founder of British sports science. He was the medical officer in charge of the British Olympic teams from 1912 until 1948. He was also the President of the British Association of Sports and Medicine, and a Fellow of the Royal Society of Medicine.

Abrahams was knighted in 1939.

Family life
Abrahams married Adrienne Walsh in 1922; they had a son and a daughter. He was the elder brother of the athletes Harold Abrahams  and Sir Sidney Abrahams .  He died on 11 December 1967.

In the Oscar-winning film Chariots of Fire, about his brother Harold Abrahams played by Ben Cross, Harold shows his friend a picture of his brother, a doctor, who was Adolphe Abrahams.

References 

1883 births
1967 deaths
Officers of the Order of the British Empire
People educated at Bedford School
People educated at Bedford Modern School
Alumni of Emmanuel College, Cambridge
Knights Bachelor
20th-century English medical doctors
English Jews
Fellows of the Royal College of Physicians
English people of Polish-Jewish descent
English people of Welsh descent
Emigrants from Cape Colony to the United Kingdom
People from Cape Town